Farzad Hassani (born 11 September 1977) is an Iranian television presenter, actor, and poet.

Filmography

Series 
 2001: Traveler from India

References

Iranian television presenters
1977 births
Iranian male television actors
Iranian male film actors
Living people
Iranian television talk show hosts
Iranian radio and television presenters